Kutsche, with numerous other spellings, is a German surname with several etymologies, including one Hungarian and several Slavic.

According to the onomast Hans Bahlow, the name Kutsche/Kutscha with different spellings, when found in the historical east (central) German linguistic area (such as Saxony, Bohemia and Silesia), is "clearly of Slavic origin, where the German u corresponds to Slavic o (as in the loan word 'Kutsche', from Hungarian Kocsi)." According to Duden: Lexikon der Familiennamen, the name Kutsche is, when of Slavic origin, derived from a Polish word for "hut." Horst Naumann explains Kutschka, Kutschke as "possibly a Polish toponymic surname, kucza, diminutive kuczka, 'tent, leaf hut, booth,' Slovak kuča, 'hut, booth' or a nickname derived from vernacular Czech kuča, 'head of hair.'"

Another possible origin is a loan word derived from the Hungarian word kocsi, meaning "from Kocs". Kocs is a village in the Hungarian county Komárom-Esztergom, which was historically noted as a post town between Budapest and Vienna. From the 15th century onwards, the term kocsi (abbreviated from the original kocsi szekér, "carriage from Kocs") came to refer to the large, usually closed, horse-drawn four-wheeled carriage which became known in English as a coach, and the term was widely adopted in other European languages. In German, the term entered usage in the early 16th century as a loan word from Hungarian, in the form Cotschien Wägnen or Gutschenwagen, which in the period prior to 1600 evolved into Gotschiwagen, Gotzig Wegen or Kutzschwagen and numerous abbreviated forms such as Gutsche, Gotzi, Kotsche and Kutze. The term was adopted as a surname by people somehow associated with coaches; e.g. people who made coaches, or someone found in a coach as a child, could be given the name. Other names with this etymology include the Dutch Koets and the Afrikaans Coetzee. The related German term Kutscher refers to someone who drives a coach, viz., a coachman; however, according to Hans Bahlow, it can also be a Germanized name, Kutscher(a), derived from the Czech Kučera, meaning "curly."

People

People with variants of the surname with either etymology include:

Gotsche
Steve Gotsche (born 1961), American golfer

Kutscha
Alexander Kutscha (1862–1921), German general
Martin Kutscha, German legal scholar
Paul Kutscha (1872–1935), Austrian painter
Kutscha (noble family), Bohemian noble family (ennobled 1837)
Kutscha-Lißberg (originally Kutscha/Kutsche), Austrian noble family (ennobled 1881)

Kutzsche
Stefan Kutzsche (born 1954), Norwegian pediatrician
Werner Kutzsche (1911–2000), German engineer and Professor of information technology

References

German-language surnames
Surnames of Hungarian origin
Surnames of Polish origin